Jayewardene, Jayawardene or Jayawardena,  is a Sinhalese surname. Notable people with the surname include:

 Amal Jayawardane, Sri Lankan historian
 A. S. Jayawardene (born 1936), Sri Lankan economist and civil servant
 Asoka Jayawardena, Sri Lankan army officer
 Athula Jayawardane, Sri Lankan army officer
 Dilan Jayawardane, Sri Lankan American engineer
 Dommie Jayawardena (1927–1979), Sri Lankan actor and singer
 Eugene Wilfred Jayewardene (1874–1932), Ceylonese lawyer and judge
 Harry Jayawardena (born 1942), Sri Lankan businessman
 Hector Alfred Jayewardene (1870–1913), Ceylonese lawyer and politician
 Hector Wilfred Jayewardene (1916–1990), Sri Lankan lawyer
 J. R. Jayewardene (1906–1996), Sri Lankan politician
 Jayalath Jayawardena (1953–2013), Sri Lankan physician and politician
 John Adrian St. Valentine Jayewardene (1877–1927), Ceylonese lawyer and judge
 Kasun Kalhara Jayawardhana (born 1981), Sri Lankan Sinhala vocalist, guitarist, record producer
 Kumari Jayawardena (born 1931), Sri Lankan academic
 Lal Jayawardena (1935–2004), Sri Lankan economist and diplomat
 Lucky Jayawardena, Sri Lankan politician
 Mahela Jayawardene (born 1977), Sri Lankan cricketer
 N. U. Jayawardena (1908–2002), Sri Lankan economist and banker
 Nalin Jayawardena (born 1957), Sri Lankan singer and vocalist
 Nuwan Jayawardene (born 1978), Sri Lankan cricketer
 Prasad Jayawardene (born 1980), Sri Lankan cricketer
 Prasanna Jayawardene (born 1979), Sri Lankan cricketer
 Ranil Jayawardena (born 1986), British politician
 Ray Jayawardhana, Sri Lankan academic
 Sahan Jayawardene (born 1990), Sri Lankan cricketer
 Sarath Jayawardene (born 1969), Sri Lankan cricketer
 Theodore Godfrey Wijesinghe Jayewardene (1872–1945), Ceylonese engineer and politician
 Thesara Jayawardane, Sri Lankan actress
 Tony Jayawardena (born 1978), British actor

See also
 
 
 
 
 
 
 

Sinhalese surnames